Giovanni Battista Grimaldi (Genoa, 1673 - Genoa, 1757) was the 162nd Doge of the Republic of Genoa.

Biography 
On 7 June 1752, the day of the abdication of Doge Stefano Lomellini, Grimaldi was elected by the Grand Council of the Republic as his successor, the seventeenth in biennial succession and the one hundred and sixty-second in republican history. In the Dogate he had to face two important internal issues, in the island of Corsica to counter the arrogance of the Marquis of Coursai and in the western Liguria where there were several anti-Genoese protests, with an indirect but "interested" involvement of the nearby Kingdom of Sardinia. He ceased office on June 7, 1754 and died in Genoa during 1757.

See also 

 Republic of Genoa
 Doge of Genoa
 House of Grimaldi

References 

18th-century Doges of Genoa
1673 births
1757 deaths